Fremrinámur is a volcano with a volcanic system located on the basalt plateau in Iceland.  It is at the junction of the Mid-Atlantic Ridge and the Greenland–Iceland–Faeroe Ridge. It is one of five volcanic systems found in the axial rift zone in north east Iceland.

The last eruption was in 800 BC (± 300 years).

References

External links
 

Volcanoes of Iceland
Volcanic systems of Iceland
North Volcanic Zone of Iceland